Center Township is one of sixteen townships in Calhoun County, Iowa, United States. At the 2000 census, its population was 1,195.

History
Center Township was created in 1872. It takes its name from its location near the center of the county.

Geography
According to the USGS, it contains five cemeteries: Greenwood, Reformatory, Rosehill, Saint Francis and Saint James.

References

External links
 City-Data.com

Townships in Calhoun County, Iowa
Townships in Iowa